Tlalim is a kibbutz in southern Israel. Located in the Negev desert, it falls under the jurisdiction of Ramat HaNegev Regional Council.

Etymology
Tlalim is the plural form of the Hebrew word for dew, tal. The kibbutz was named for the large amount of dew which falls in the area each year.

History
Tlalim was founded in 1980 by a gar'in of Hebrew Scouts. It was one of the first kibbutzim to be privatised.

Economy
As well as the standard agriculture, the kibbutz also has a concrete factory.

References

External links
Tlalim Negev Information Center

Kibbutzim
Kibbutz Movement
Privatized kibbutzim
Populated places established in 1980
Populated places in Southern District (Israel)
1980 establishments in Israel